Lingerie is a category of primarily women's clothing including undergarments (mainly brassieres), sleepwear, and lightweight robes. The choice of the word is often motivated by an intention to imply that the garments are alluring, fashionable, or both. In a 2015 US survey, 75% of women and 26% of men reported having worn "sexy lingerie" in their lifetime.

Lingerie is made of lightweight, stretchy, smooth, sheer or decorative fabrics such as silk, satin, Lycra, charmeuse, chiffon, or (especially and traditionally) lace. These fabrics can be made of various natural fibres like silk or cotton or of various synthetic fibres like polyester or nylon.

Etymology 

The word lingerie is a word taken directly from the French language, meaning undergarments, and used exclusively for more lightweight items of female undergarments. The French word in its original form derives from the French word , meaning 'linen' or 'clothes'.  Informal usage suggests visually appealing or even erotic clothing. Although most lingerie is designed to be worn by women, some manufacturers now design lingerie for men.

Origins 

The concept of lingerie as a visually appealing undergarment was developed during the late nineteenth century. Lady Duff-Gordon of Lucile was a pioneer in developing lingerie that freed women from more restrictive corsets. Through the first half of the 20th century, women wore underwear for three primary reasons: to alter their outward shape (first with corsets and later with girdles or brassieres), for hygienic reasons and for modesty. Before the invention of crinoline, women's underwear was often very large and bulky.

During the late 19th century, corsets became smaller, less bulky and more constricting and were gradually supplanted by the brassiere, first patented in the 20th century by Caresse Crosby. When the First World War broke out, women found themselves filling in men's work roles, creating a demand for more practical undergarments. Manufacturers began to use lighter and more breathable fabrics. In 1935, brassières were updated with padded cups to flatter small breasts and three years later underwire bras were introduced that gave a protruding bustline. There was also a return to a small waist achieved with girdles. The 1940s woman was thin, but had curvaceous hips and breasts that were pointy and shapely. In the 1960s, the female silhouette was liberated along with social mores. The look was adolescent breasts, slim hips, and extreme thinness. André Courrèges was the first to make a fashion statement out of the youth culture when his 1965 collection presented androgynous figures and the image of a modern woman comfortable with her own body.

As the 20th century progressed, underwear became smaller and more form fitting. In the 1960s, lingerie manufacturers such as Frederick's of Hollywood begin to glamorise lingerie. The lingerie industry expanded in the 21st century with designs that doubled as outerwear. The French refer to this as 'dessous-dessus,' meaning something akin to innerwear as outerwear.

Market structure 

The global lingerie market in 2003 was estimated at $29 billion, while in 2005, bras accounted for 56 percent of the lingerie market and briefs represented 29 percent. The United States's largest lingerie retailer, Victoria's Secret, operates almost exclusively in North America, but the European market is fragmented, with Triumph International and DB Apparel predominant. Also prominent are French lingerie houses, including Chantelle and Aubade.

In March 2020 The Guardian reported a trend for male lingerie on the catwalk and predictions as to the likelihood of it successfully extending to the high street fashion stores.

Typology 
 Babydoll, a short nightgown, or negligee, intended as nightwear for women. A shorter style, it is often worn with panties. Babydolls are typically loose-fitting with an empire waist and thin straps.
 Basque, a tight, form-fitting bodice or coat.
 Bloomers, baggy underwear that extends to just below or above the knee. Bloomers were worn for several decades during the first part of the 20th century, but are not widely worn today.
 Bodystocking, a unitard. Bodystockings may be worn over the torso, or they may be worn over the thighs and abdomen.
 Bodice, covers the body from the neck to the waist. Bodices are often low cut in the front and high in the back, and are often connected with laces or hooks. Bodices may also be reinforced with steel or bone to provide greater breast support.

 Brassiere, more commonly referred to as a bra, a close-fitting garment that is worn to help lift and support a woman's breasts
 Bustier, a form fitting garment used to push up the bust and to shape the waist.
 Camisole, sleeveless and covering the top part of the body. Camisoles are typically constructed of light materials and feature thin spaghetti straps.
 Chemise, a one-piece undergarment that is the same in shape as a straight-hanging sleeveless dress. It is similar to the babydoll, but it is fitted more closely around the hips.
 Corset, a bodice worn to mould and shape the torso. This effect is typically achieved through boning, either of bone or steel.
 Corselet, or merry widow, combined brassiere and girdle. The corselet is considered to be a type of foundation garment, and the modern corselet is most commonly known as a shaping slip.
 G-string, or thong, a type of panty, characterised by a narrow piece of cloth that passes between the buttocks and is attached to a band around the hips. A G-string or thong may be worn as a bikini bottom or as underwear.

 Garter/Garter belt/Suspender belt, used to keep stockings up.
 Girdle, a type of foundation garment. Historically, the girdle extended from the waist to the upper thigh, though modern styles more closely resemble a tight pair of athletic shorts.
 Hosiery, close-fitting, elastic garments that cover the feet and legs.
 Negligee, a dressing gown. It is usually floor length, though it can be knee length as well.
 Nightgown, or nightie, a loosely hanging item of nightwear, may vary from hip-length (babydoll) to floor-length (peignoir).
 Nightshirt, a shirt meant to be worn while sleeping. It is usually longer and looser than the average T-shirt, and it is typically made of softer material.
 Panties or knickers, a generic term for underwear covering the genitals and sometimes buttocks that come in all shapes, fabrics and colours, offering varying degrees of coverage. 
 Petticoat, an underskirt. Petticoats were prominent throughout the 16th to 20th centuries. Today, petticoats are typically worn to add fullness to skirts in the Gothic and Lolita subcultures.
 Pettipants, a type of bloomer featuring ruffles, resembling petticoats. Pettipants are most commonly worn by square dancers and people participating in historical reenactment.
 Tanga, a type of panty featuring full back and front coverage, but string-like sides that are typically thicker than those found on a string bikini.
 Tap pants, a type of short typically made of lace, silk or satin.
 Teddy, an undergarment that resembles the shape of a one-piece bathing suit because it is typically sleeveless, and sometimes even strapless.
 Undergarment, a garment which one wears underneath clothes. Also known as "underwear."

See also 

Ring, slide and hook

References

Bibliography 
 Carter, Alison J. (1992). Underwear: the fashion history. Batsford. 
 Cox, Caroline (2000). Lingerie: a lexicon of style. Scriptum Editions.

External links

 
Undergarments
Women's clothing